Stuart Davenport (born 21 September 1962 in Auckland, New Zealand) is a former professional squash player from New Zealand. He reached the World No. 3 ranking in 1987.

Davenport learned to play squash in Christchurch, and was an outstanding junior (particularly after a growth spurt aided the physical side of his game after the age of 15). Coached by the legendary Dardir El Bakary, Davenport developed an excellent attacking game with the full array of volleys and attacking strokeplay.

In 1980 he led the New Zealand Junior team to third place at the World Junior Championship in Sweden (after finishing third himself in the individual event). That same year he won the British under-19 title, and in 1982 took out the British under-23 championships.

A distinguished senior professional career followed, highlights of which included finishing third in the World Individual Championships held in New Zealand in 1983, and several outstanding efforts for New Zealand in World Teams Championships events.

References

Living people
New Zealand male squash players
1962 births